Ashburton River may refer to:

Ashburton River / Hakatere, New Zealand
Ashburton River (Western Australia)